Anitrazifen is a drug displaying COX-2 inhibitor activity.

References 

Nonsteroidal anti-inflammatory drugs
COX-2 inhibitors
Triazines
Phenol ethers